Jacob Cowing (born February 4, 2001) is an American football wide receiver for the Arizona Wildcats. He previously played at UTEP.

Early life and high school
Cowing grew up in Maricopa, Arizona and attended Maricopa High School. As a senior, he had 28 receptions for 872 yards and 10 touchdowns. Cowing committed to play college football at UTEP, which was his only Division I FBS offer.

College career
Cowing became a starter at wide receiver during his freshman season and caught 31 passes with a team-leading 550 receiving yards and three touchdown receptions. He was named second team All-Conference USA as a sophomore after leading the Miners with 41 receptions for 691 yards and three touchdowns. Cowing was named first team All-Conference USA after catching 69 passes for 1,354 yards and seven touchdowns in his junior season. After the season, he entered the NCAA transfer portal.

Cowing ultimately transferred to Arizona. He was named to the watchlist for the Fred Biletnikoff Award entering his first season at Arizona.

References

External links
UTEP Miners bio
Arizona Wildcats bio

Living people
Players of American football from Arizona
American football wide receivers
Arizona Wildcats football players
UTEP Miners football players
People from Maricopa County, Arizona
2001 births